Buell may refer to:

People 
 Buell (surname)
 Buell (given name)

Places 
 Buell, Missouri, United States, an unincorporated community
 Buell Peak, Washington state, United States
 Buell Peninsula, Victoria Land, Antarctica
 Buell Seamount, in the Atlantic Ocean

Other uses 
 Buell Elementary School, in Mount Morris Township, Michigan, site of a school shooting in 2000
 Buell Children's Museum, Pueblo, Colorado, United States
Buell Hall, a building on the campus of Columbia University
 Buell Motorcycle Company, a former motorcycle manufacturer based in East Troy, Wisconsin
 Erik Buell Racing, a company that makes racing motorcycles that is based in East Troy, Wisconsin

See also
 Buel (disambiguation)
 Temple Buell College, a former name of Colorado Women's College